Chai Fonacier (born December 25, 1986) is a Filipina actress, singer, writer and songwriter.

Career

Music 

Fonancier was a contestant of the first season of Pinoy Dream Academy. She was also a part of the defunct Cebu-based trip hop trio Womb with Anthony Uy and Fender Figuera.

Acting 

Fonacier won her first Best Supporting Actress award in the 11th Sinulog Film Festival for her performance in Ara Chawdhury's short film Operation Prutas in 2015. Later in the same year, she appeared in the Cinema One Originals Digital Film Festival entry Miss Bulalacao and won the Best Supporting Actress award.

In 2016, Fonacier appeared in the film Pauwi Na. For her performance in Patay na si Hesus, Fonacier was awarded Best Supporting Actress in the 35th Luna Awards.

In 2018, Fonacier appeared in the film Asuang. She also appeared in Halik and Wansapanataym'''s Switch be with You miniseries, both running from 2018 to 2019.

In 2019, she appeared in the films Born Beautiful and Sakaling Maging Tayo. Later in the same year, she would reprise her role in the TV adaptation of Born Beautiful''.

Personal life

When speaking of her acting role portraying a trans man, Fonacier stated she identifies as cisgender and mostly straight, so she talked to her LGBTQ++ friends about their experiences to prepare for the role and to perform it with sensitivity.

She speaks English, Tagalog, Cebuano and Hiligaynon.

Filmography

Television

Film

Awards and nominations

Notes

References

External links

People from Cagayan de Oro
Living people
1996 births
Cebuano film actresses
Cebuano television actresses
21st-century Cebuano actresses
People from Cebu City